Paraskevi Tsiamita (born March 10, 1972) is a former track and field athlete from Greece who competed in long jump and triple jump. In 1998 she improved her personal best in triple jump by approximately one metre, and became world champion in 1999 with a personal best jump of 15.07 metres. This was the national record until 2004, when Hrysopiyi Devetzi jumped 15.32 m at the Olympic Games.

Her personal best in long jump is 6.93 metres, achieved in August 1999 in Patras. This places her second in the all-time Greek performers list, only behind Niki Xanthou. 

Tsiamita retired in 2004 because of persistent injury problems.

Achievements

References

1972 births
Living people
Greek female triple jumpers
Greek female long jumpers
Athletes from Volos
World Athletics Championships medalists
World Athletics Championships winners